Lee Seul-bee (born June 25, 1988 in North Gyeongsang Province) is a South Korean curler from Gyeonggi Province. She played third for the Kim Ji-sun team representing South Korea at the 2014 Winter Olympics in Sochi, Russia.

Personal life
Lee married Bak Seong-jun in a ceremony in Seoul in June 2014.

References

http://www.sochi2014.com/en/athlete-seulbee-lee

External links

1988 births
Living people
South Korean female curlers
Curlers at the 2014 Winter Olympics
Olympic curlers of South Korea
Sportspeople from North Gyeongsang Province
Sportspeople from Gyeonggi Province
Universiade medalists in curling
Pacific-Asian curling champions
Universiade silver medalists for South Korea
Competitors at the 2011 Winter Universiade
21st-century South Korean women